Teleu (other names: Telyau, Tiele, Teli, Tele, Tilyau, Telew, Tileu, Teles; in bashkir language - Теләү) - the genus name as part of the Bashkirian from Tabin clan. Ethnographic group with name Teleu have in Kazakhs (as part of the Little Horde) and Uzbeks (as part of Kurama), with the names of Tieli, Tileukusshi - in the Karakalpaks, Televs - among Kyrgyzs, Tiele - among Nogais.

Tribal lines from Teleu
(Besey, Kazak, Kaip, Qyzilbash-Qatay, Qipsaq, Meskeu, Tuk, Tubal, Hari, Henek, Bure, Uff-Suraman).

Surmames
Akhanovs, Garipovs, Ishmuratovs, Lukmanovs, Muratovs, Saitgalins, Kalyamovs, Zhinalinovs, Saimbetovs and others.

Ethnic history
In their study, the researchers R.G. Kuzeev notes that the Bashkir and Kazakh ethnonyms in form Teleu - back origin from the Teleuts, it proves identity ethnicons Teleu and Teleuts.

Ethnonym
The ethnonym 'Teleu' (In Chinese language - 'Tiele' 鐵勒 or 'people Dinlings' 丁零). L.P.Potapov also believes that the basic Turkic-speaking tribal groups Teleuts, Telengits and Teles preserved in its name ancient ethnonym Tiele.

References

See also
 Tiele people

History of Ural
Bashkir people
Turkic peoples of Asia